Tres Quebradas may refer to:
Los Patos (also known as Tres Quebradas), a mountain in Argentina
Tres Quebradas, Los Santos, a corregimiento in Panama